The Mej river is a left bank tributary of Chambal River. It originates near Mandalgarh in Bhilwara District and joins Chambal in Kota district. The catchment area of Mej river extends over Bhilwara District, Bundi District, and Tonk District of Rajasthan. Tributaries are Wajan, Kural, Mangali, Ghoda Pachhad and others.

Chambal River
Rivers of Rajasthan
Rivers of India